Stephanie Ann Verdoia (born January 2, 1993) is an American soccer player who last played for Vålerenga in the Toppserien.

Club career
After playing four years at Seattle University, Verdoia was drafted by the Boston Breakers with the 29th pick in the 2015 NWSL College Draft. She signed with the Breakers for the 2015 Season and made eight appearances for the club. In 2016, she made 10 appearances. She was waived by the Breakers on January 27, 2017.

Verdoia signed with Vålerenga in the Toppserien for the 2017 season.

She attended training camp with the Seattle Reign in 2018, but she did not make the final roster.

International career
Verdoia received a call-up for the United States U-23 team for the Six Nations Tournament in 2015. This was her debut in a United States jersey.

References

External links 
 

1993 births
Living people
American women's soccer players
National Women's Soccer League players
Boston Breakers players
Soccer players from Salt Lake City
Women's association football midfielders
Seattle Redhawks women's soccer players
Boston Breakers draft picks
Vålerenga Fotball Damer players